Robert Clugston (born April 15, 1889 - Date of death unknown) was an actor in silent films. He had several leading parts and worked for the Fox Film Corporation.

Clugston was born in Elgin, Illinois.

Selected filmography
The Haunted Manor (1916)
The Siren (1917)
The Hunting of the Hawk (1917)
 Little Miss Nobody (1917)
Kick In (1917)
 The Little Terror (1917)

References

1889 births
Male actors from Illinois
American male silent film actors
20th-century American male actors
People from Elgin, Illinois